Pareutropius longifilis is a species of fish in the family Schilbeidae. It is found in Malawi, Mozambique and Tanzania where it occurs in rivers north of and in the Ruvuma River system, Lake Chiuta and Lake Chilwa. Its natural habitats are freshwater lakes and intermittent freshwater lakes.  This species grows to a length of  TL.

References

 

Pareutropius
Fish of Africa
Fish of Mozambique
Fish of Tanzania
Fish of Malawi
Taxonomy articles created by Polbot
Fish described in 1914